State Route 291 (SR 291), also known as Bloomington Road, is a  north-south state highway in Putnam County, Tennessee. It connects the communities of Double Springs and Bloomington Springs.

Route description
SR 291 begins at an intersection with US 70N (SR 24) in Double Springs. It winds its way northwest through farmland and rural areas for two miles before entering Bloomington Springs and coming to an end at an intersection with SR 56. The entire route of SR 291 is a rural two-lane highway.

Major intersections

References

291
Transportation in Putnam County, Tennessee